This is a list of submissions to the 87th Academy Awards for Best Foreign Language Film. The Academy of Motion Picture Arts and Sciences (AMPAS) has invited the film industries of a number of countries to submit their best film for the Academy Award for Best Foreign Language Film every year since the award was created in 1956. It is presented annually by the Academy to a feature-length film produced outside the United States with primarily non-English dialogue. The Foreign Language Film Award Committee oversees the process, reviewing all films submitted.

For the 87th Academy Awards, held on 22 February 2015, a submitted motion picture must be released theatrically in its respective country between 1 October 2013 and 30 September 2014. Submission of a film does not automatically qualify it for the competition; AMPAS has the final word on eligibility, and has disqualified submissions in the past. One film was accepted from each country, with a deadline of 1 October 2014; the Academy published a list of eligible films eight days later.

Eighty-three countries submitted films, with four countries entering for the first time. Mauritania submitted Timbuktu, directed by Abderrahmane Sissako; Panama entered the documentary Invasion, directed by Abner Benaim; Kosovo submitted Three Windows and a Hanging, directed by Isa Qosja; and Malta entered Simshar, directed by Rebecca Cremona. 

The Phase I committee, consisting of several hundred Los Angeles-based Academy members, viewed the original submissions between mid-October and 15 December 2014. The group's top six choices, augmented by three selections by the Academy's Foreign Language Film Award Executive Committee, constitute the shortlist. Seventy-six films were originally considered, and the nine finalists were shortlisted in mid-December.

The list was narrowed down to five nominees by invited committees in New York, Los Angeles and (for the first time) London, who viewed three films a day from 9 to 11 January 2015 before casting their ballots. The list of nominees was announced on 15 January 2015 at the Samuel Goldwyn Theater in Los Angeles. They were Argentina's Wild Tales, directed by Damián Szifron; Estonia's Tangerines, directed by Zaza Urushadze; Mauritania's Timbuktu, directed by Abderrahmane Sissako; Poland's Ida, directed by Paweł Pawlikowski, and Russia's Leviathan, directed by Andrey Zvyagintsev. For the first time, the director's name would be engraved on the Oscar statuette in addition to the country name. The winner was Poland's Ida, directed by Pawlikowski.

Submissions

Notes
  The Lebanese film Ghadi was originally selected as their entry for the 86th Academy Awards in a two-way race over Lara Saba's Blind Intersections. When the film's release date was moved from 26 September 2013 to 31 October 2013, it no longer met the eligibility dates and Blind Intersections was submitted instead.
  In May 2014, Nigeria announced that AMPAS had approved the first-ever Nigerian Oscar selection committee and they would make their first Oscar submission; however, they did not submit a film by the deadline.

References

External links
 Official website of the Academy Awards
 The Official Academy Awards Database
 IMDb Academy Awards Page

2013 in film
2014 in film
87